Taenaris chionides is a butterfly in the family Nymphalidae. It was described by Frederick DuCane Godman and Osbert Salvin in 1880. It is endemic to New Guinea in the Australasian realm.

Subspecies
T. c. chionides
T. c. kubaryi   Staudinger, 1894  (New Guinea - Huon Peninsula)
T. c. aroana   (Fruhstorfer, 1901) (New Guinea)
T. c. ambigua  Stichel, 1906  (New Guinea)

References

External links
Taenaris at Markku Savela's Lepidoptera and Some Other Life Forms

Taenaris
Butterflies described in 1880
Endemic fauna of New Guinea
Taxa named by Frederick DuCane Godman
Taxa named by Osbert Salvin